The decade of the 1190s in art involved some significant events.

Events

Works
 1192: Kaikei sculpts Maitreya in Sanbō-in, an Important Cultural Property of Japan.
 1194: Kaikei sculpts Vairocana in Ishiyama-dera, an Important Cultural Property of Japan
 1195: Kaikei sculpts Amitābha Triad in Jōdo-ji, a National Treasure of Japan
 1196: Jōkei sculpts Yuima in Kōfuku-ji
 1196: Unknown Kei school artist sculpts Monju Bosatsu in Kōfuku-ji
 1197: Unkei sculpts Fudo Myoo in Kongōbu-ji

Births
 1195: Xia Gui – Chinese scroll painter of the Song Dynasty, great master of the Southern Song landscape style (d. 1224)

Deaths
 1197: Li Di – Chinese imperial court painter (b. 1100)

Art
Decades of the 12th century in art